G protein-coupled receptor 56 also known as TM7XN1 is a protein encoded by the ADGRG1 gene. GPR56 is a member of the adhesion GPCR family.
Adhesion GPCRs are characterized by an extended extracellular region often possessing N-terminal protein modules that is linked to a TM7 region via a domain known as the GPCR-Autoproteolysis INducing (GAIN) domain.

GPR56 is expressed in liver, muscle, tendon, neural, and cytotoxic lymphoid cells in human as well as in hematopoietic precursor, muscle, and developing neural cells in the mouse.
GPR56 has been shown to have numerous role in cell guidance/adhesion as exemplified by its roles in tumour inhibition and neuron development. More recently it has been shown to be a marker for cytotoxic T cells and  a subgroup of Natural killer cells.

Ligands 

GPR56 binds transglutaminase 2 to suppress tumor metastasis and binds collagen III to regulate cortical development and lamination.

Signaling 

GPR56 couples to Gαq/11 protein upon association with the tetraspanins CD9 and CD81. Forced GPR56 expression activates NF-kB, PAI-1, and TCF transcriptional response elements. The splicing of GPR56 induces tumorigenic responses as a result of activating the transcription of genes, such as COX2, iNOS, and VEGF85. GPR56 couples to the Gα12/13 protein and activates RhoA and mammalian target of rapamycin (mTOR) pathway upon ligand binding. Lack of the N-terminal fragment (NTF) of GPR56 causes stronger RhoA signaling and β-arrestin accumulation, leading to extensive ubiquitination of the C-terminal fragment (CTF). Finally, GPR56 suppresses PKCα activation to regulate angiogenesis.

Function 

Studies in the hematopoietic system disclosed that during endothelial to hematopoietic stem cell transition, Gpr56 is a transcriptional target of the heptad complex of hematopoietic transcription factors, and is required for hematopoietic cluster formation. Recently, two studies showed that GPR56, is a cell autonomous regulator of oligodendrocyte development through Gα12/13 proteins and Rho activation. Della Chiesa et al. demonstrate that GPR56 is expressed on CD56dull natural killer (NK) cells. Lin and Hamann's group show all human cytotoxic lymphocytes, including CD56dull NK cells and CD27–CD45RA+ effector-type CD8+ T cells, express GPR56.

Clinical significance 

GPR56 was the first adhesion GPCR causally linked to a disease. Loss-of-function mutations in GPR56 cause a severe cortical malformation known as bilateral frontoparietal polymicrogyria (BFPP). Investigating the pathological mechanism of disease-associated GPR56 mutations in BFPP has provided mechanistic insights into the functioning of adhesion GPCRs. Researchers demonstrated that disease-associated GPR56 mutations cause BFPP via multiple mechanisms. Li et al. demonstrated that GPR56 regulates pial basement membrane (BM) organization during cortical development. Disruption of the Gpr56 gene in mice leads to neuronal malformation in the cerebral cortex, which resulted in 4 critical pathological morphologies: defective pial BM, abnormal localized radial glial endfeet, malpositioned Cajal-Retzius cells, and overmigrated neurons. Furthermore, the interaction of GPR56 and collagen III inhibits neural migration to regulate lamination of the cerebral cortex. Next to GPR56, the α3β1 integrin is also involved in pial BM maintenance. Study from Itga3 (α3 integrin)/Gpr56 double knockout mice showed increased neuronal overmigration compared to Gpr56 single knockout mice, indicating cooperation of GPR56 and α3β1 integrin in modulation of the development of the cerebral cortex. More recently, the Walsh laboratory showed that alternative splicing of GPR56 regulates regional cerebral cortical patterning.

In depression patients, blood GPR56 mRNA expression increases only in responders and not non-responders to serotonin-norepinephrine reuptake inhibitor treatment. Furthermore, GPR56 was down-regulated in the prefrontal cortex of individuals with depression that died by suicide.

Outside the nervous system, GPR56 has been linked to muscle function and male fertility. The expression of GPR56 is upregulated during early differentiation of human myoblasts. Investigation of Gpr56 knockout mice and BFPP patients showed that GPR56 is required for in vitro myoblast fusion via signaling of serum response factor (SRF) and nuclear factor of activated T-cell (NFAT), but is not essential for muscle development in vivo. Additionally, GPR56 is a transcriptional target of peroxisome proliferator-activated receptor gamma coactivator 1-alpha 4 and regulates overload-induced muscle hypertrophy through Gα12/13 and mTOR signaling. Therefore, the study of knockout mice revealed that GPR56 is involved in testis development and male fertility. In melanocytic cells GPR56 gene expression may be regulated by MITF.

Mutations in GPR56 cause the brain developmental disorder BFPP, characterized by disordered cortical lamination in frontal cortex. Mice lacking expression of GPR56 develop a comparable phenotype. Furthermore, loss of GPR56 leads to reduced fertility in male mice, resulting from a defect in seminiferous tubule development. GPR56 is expressed in glioblastoma/astrocytoma as well as in esophageal squamous cell, breast, colon, non-small cell lung, ovarian, and pancreatic carcinoma. GPR56 was shown to localize together with α-actinin at the leading edge of membrane filopodia in glioblastoma cells, suggesting a role in cell adhesion/migration. In addition, recombinant GPR56-NTF protein interacts with glioma cells to inhibit cellular adhesion. Inactivation of Von Hippel-Lindau (VHL) tumor-suppressor gene and hypoxia suppressed GPR56 in a renal cell carcinoma cell line, but hypoxia influenced GPR56 expression in breast or bladder cancer cell lines. GPR56 is a target gene for vezatin, an adherens junctions transmembrane protein, which is a tumor suppressor in gastric cancer. Xu et al. used an in vivo metastatic model of human melanoma to show that GPR56 is downregulated in highly metastatic cells. Later, by ectopic expression and RNA interference they confirmed that GPR56 inhibits melanoma tumor growth and metastasis. Silenced expression of GPR56 in HeLa cells enhanced apoptosis and anoikis, but suppressed anchorage-independent growth and cell adhesion. High ecotropic viral integration site-1 acute myeloid leukemia (EVI1-high AML) expresses GPR56 that was found to be a transcriptional target of EVI1. Silencing expression of GPR56 decreases adhesion, cell growth and induces apoptosis through reduced RhoA signaling. GPR56 suppresses the angiogenesis and melanoma growth through inhibition of vascular endothelial growth factor (VEGF) via PKCα signaling pathway. Furthermore, GPR56 expression was found to be negatively correlated with the malignancy of melanomas in human patients.

References

External links 
 Adhesion GPCR consortium
  GeneReviews/NIH/NCBI/UW entry on Polymicrogyria Overview

G protein-coupled receptors